Inspector Montalbano is an Italian  police procedural television series.  Since 6 May 1999, 37 original episodes have been produced and broadcast by RAI.

Preview

Episodes

Series 1 (1999)

Series 2 (2000)

Series 3 (2001)

Series 4 (2002)

Series 5 (2005)

Series 6 (2006)

Season 7 (2008)

Series 8 (2011)

Series 9 (2013)

Series 10 (2016)

Series 11 (2017)

Series 12 (2018)

Series 13 (2019)

Series 14 (2020)

External links 
 

Andrea Camilleri
Lists of Italian television series episodes

de:Andrea Camilleri#Commissario Montalbano